Queen Nwokoye  (born 11 August 1982) is a Nigerian actress. She is best known for starring as the lead character in a 2014 film titled Chetanna which earned her a "Best Actress" nomination at the 11th Africa Movie Academy Awards.

Early life and education
Nwokoye was born in Lagos State into a Catholic family, but she hails from Ovim in Isuikwuato Local Government of Abia State Nigeria She started her Education at  Air Force primary school. She completed her secondary school education at Queen's College, Enugu before she proceeded to Nnamdi Azikiwe University Awka, Anambra state where she studied sociology and anthropology. She grew up with the ambition of becoming a lawyer.

Career
Since making her acting debut in 2004 in a film titled Nna Men, Nwokoye has gone on to star in several Nigerian films, winning awards and earning nominations.

Filmography

Nna Men (2004)
His Majesty (2004)
The Girl is Mine (2004)
Security Risk (2004)
Save The Baby (2005)
Back Drop (2005)
Speak The Word (2006)
My Girlfriend (2006)
Last Kobo (2006)
Lady of Faith (2006)
Disco Dance (2006)
Clash of Interest (2006)
The Last Supper (2007)
When You Are Mine (2007)
The Cabals (2007)
Show Me Heaven (2007)
Short of Time (2007)
Sand in My Shoes (2007)
Powerful Civilian (2007)
Old Cargos (2007)
My Everlasting Love (2007)
Confidential Romance (2007)
The Evil Queen (2008)
Temple of Justice (2008)
Onoja (2008)
Heart of a Slave (2008)
Female Lion (2008)
Angelic Bride (2008)
Prince of The Niger (2009)
Personal Desire (2009)
League of Gentlemen (2009)
Last Mogul of the League (2009)
Jealous Friend (2009)
Makers of Justice (2010)
Mirror of Life (2011)
End of Mirror of Life (2011)
Chetanna (2014)
Nkwocha (2012)
Ekwonga (2013)
Ada Mbano (2014)
Agaracha (2016)
New Educated Housewife (2017)
Blind Bartimus (2015)

Evil Coffin (2016)
Chosen Bride
Heart of Gold (2019)

Awards and nominations

Personal life
Queen Nwokoye is married to Mr. Uzoma with whom she has a set of twin boys and a daughter

References

External links

1982 births
Living people
Nigerian film actresses
Nnamdi Azikiwe University alumni
21st-century Nigerian actresses
Igbo actresses
Actresses from Abia State
Nigerian film award winners